This is a list of notable footballers who have played for Macclesfield Town F.C. Generally, this means players that have played 100 senior matches for the club. Other players who have played an important role for the club can be included, but the reason why they have been included should be added in the 'Notes' column.

For a list of all Macclesfield players, major or minor, with a Wikipedia article, see Category:Macclesfield Town players, and for the current squad see the main Macclesfield Town article.

Players are listed according to the date of their first team debut. Appearances and goals are for first-team competitive matches only; wartime matches are excluded. Substitute appearances included.

Table

References 

Macclesfield Players Football League Statistics at Neil Brown site

 
Association football player non-biographical articles
Macclesfield
Players